Freakbeat is a loosely defined subgenre of rock and roll music developed mainly by harder-driving British groups during the Swinging London period of the mid-to late 1960s. The genre bridges British Invasion R&B, beat and psychedelia.

Etymology
The term was coined by English music journalist Phil Smee. AllMusic writes that "freakbeat" is loosely defined, but generally describes the more obscure but hard-edged artists of the British Invasion era such as the Creation, the Pretty Things, The Smoke, or Denny Laine (in his early solo work).

Compilations 
Much of the material collected on Rhino Records's 2001 box-set compilation Nuggets II: Original Artyfacts from the British Empire and Beyond, 1964–1969 can be classified as freakbeat.

The English Freakbeat series is a group of five compilation albums, released in the late 1980s, that were issued by AIP Records. The LPs featured recordings that were released in the mid-1960s by English rock bands in R&B and beat genres.  The series served as a follow-up to the Pebbles, Volume 6 LP, itself subtitled The Roots of Mod, which was the only album in the Pebbles series that was devoted to English music.  When the English Freakbeat series was reissued as CDs in the 1990s, the Pebbles, Volume 6 LP was adapted into the English Freakbeat, Volume 6 CD.

References

External links
Freakbeat information
Essay about freakbeat
"Looking Back 80 Mod, Freakbeat & Swinging London Nuggets" compilation

British rock music genres
British styles of music
Psychedelic music
Mod (subculture)
Garage rock
Beat music